Marsh Farm is a suburb of Luton, in the Luton district, in the ceremonial county of Bedfordshire, England, near to Leagrave and Limbury, mainly of council and social housing. The area is bounded by the edge of Luton to the north, Bramingham Road to the south, Spinney Wood and the path from the wood to the edge of Luton to the west, and Great Bramingham wood to the east.

Etymology 
The estate takes its name from the farm that owned much of the land that eventually became the estate. Marsh Farm was located by Leagrave Marsh and part of the old farmland is now Leagrave Park.

History
The estate was built in the late 1960s, with a mixture of flats and houses as part of the post-war expansion of Luton, mostly for overspill population rehoused from London. The estates at Farley Hill, Hockwell Ring and Stopsley were all built at about the same time.

Local area

The Purley Centre 
The Purley Centre was a council-owned shopping centre that contained the Marsh Farm Library and local business, such as supermarkets, a pub named The Purley Tavern and restaurants, and a multi-storey block of flats adjacent. It was the host of a marketplace that took place on Thursdays and Saturdays; it was opposite Marsh Farm  House, a former factory-turned local community centre.

Transport 
Marsh Farm is well connected by bus with regular services to Luton Town Centre. The estate benefits from the M1 as well as connections to the A6. Luton Airport is within 7 miles.

Leagrave railway station is a 20-minute walk from Marsh Farm and there are frequent trains to Luton, St Albans, Bedford, London, Brighton and Sevenoaks. Arriva run their 24, 25 and 27 services through the estate, whilst Centrebus provide connections with their faster 'top10' service to the Town Centre.

Local schools and education
Primary Schools
 Waulud Primary School, Wauluds Bank Drive
 Whitefield Primary Academy, Stockholm Way

Secondary schools
 Lea Manor High School and community college, Northwell Drive
 Lealands High School, Sundon Park Road
 Woodlands Secondary School, Northwell Drive

Library
 Marsh Farm Library, Lea Manor High School

Religion 
The estate lies within the ecclesiastical benefice of The Holy Cross, Marsh Farm and is served by the Parish Church of the Holy Cross (Church of England) built in 1976 and located in the centre of the estate adjacent to the medical centre on Purway Close. The Parish is registered with Forward in Faith and is Anglo-Catholic in its theology and worship. The Roman Catholic Church of The Holy Family is located off Northwell Drive and is one of the largest parishes in the Diocese of Northampton. During the season of Lent both Churches join together in the Stations of the Cross.

Local refurbishment 
Marsh Farm made national news in July 1995 when the social problems boiled over into three days of rioting. Although local police received the help of the Metropolitan Police riot squad to bring the situation under control, it was the rave organisers Exodus Collective who brought the riots to an end by staging an impromptu party out of town which drew 2,000 young people from the area and calmed them down. The riots also resulted in a policeman being stabbed, all of the estate's public buildings being vandalised or set alight, cars were stolen and then set alight by joyriders as young as 12. A less notorious riot also occurred on the estate in July 1992.

Whilst many parts of the estate still look like a typical 1960s development, the estate has £32m of European money available for re-development and plans were created by the local council and other interested parties. Councillor Tom Shaw later said that he hoped it would remove the media's memories of Marsh Farm's anti-social past: "The bad reputation - people keep on talking about that [...] That was 25 years ago. People who live on Marsh Farm, love Marsh Farm;" and Mark Peasey the divisional director added: "[the riots were] a long, long time ago [...] We are developing skills for local people and we can leave a legacy behind [with people] continuing to work in the construction industry[.]"

In the summer of 1999, some regeneration money was used to fund murals on the underpasses around the estate. The lead artist, Viv McIntyre, visited schools on the estate and carried out workshops with the pupils, where they provided the images (based on given themes) to create the mural designs. A team of artists then worked with the children to transfer the designs from paper to the walls.

Work was halted until the 2010s, in which tenants were relocated, and old homes were demolished and rebuilt, notably The Purley Centre between 2017 and 2018, which was replaced by houses, a new row of stores, low rise apartments and recreation space. Marsh Farm Library was relocated to Lea Manor High School, which received its own refurbishment between 2009 and 2011. The three tower blocks received sprinkler systems after concerns were raised during the Grenfell Tower fire and blue cladding is being added around the sides.

Politics
Marsh Farm is part of the Northwell ward, which is represented by Cllr Anne Donelon (Labour) and Cllr Yasmin Waheed (Labour).

The ward forms part of the parliamentary constituency of Luton North and the MP is Sarah Owen (Labour).

Local attractions

Notes

References

External links

 Luton Borough Council
  BBC News article about funding

Housing estates in England
Areas of Luton